Moscow Mission (or Countdown) is a Russian action movie directed by Vadim Shmelyov. The movie was released in Moscow in 2006.

Plot

There will be an explosion exactly in 48 hours in Moscow. The information was provided by an agent who was killed this very second. All Intelligence Services work on it, but the only hope is for recently organized independent team. They are a hacker girl who once broke through Pentagon servers, a former special operative officer who enjoys speed and adrenalin, psychologist, a lady whose beauty outshines her intelligence and her rank of major, and a blind field engineer whose sense of smell and intuition substitute for his eyesight... And the Chief who got them all together and learned how to control them.

Only this team is able to figure it out who, and most importantly where, by knowing just when...

Cast
 Andrey Merzlikin as Maks
 Maksim Sukhanov as Starshiy (Denis)
 Leonid Yarmolnik as Krot
 Oksana Akinshina as Anna
 Oleg Stefan as Martin
 Aleksandr Ustyugov as Martin's aid
 Andrey Ilyin as Grishin
 Anastasia Makeyeva as Olga
 Pavel Smetankin as Hadid
 James Derrick as Agent Kevin

See also
 Countdown, another similar Russian action film

Notes

External links
 

2006 films
2000s Russian-language films
Russian action thriller films
Films about the Federal Security Service
2006 action thriller films